Medical education in Australia is provided by the medical schools and faculties of various universities, accreditation for which is provided by the Australian Medical Council. There are both undergraduate and graduate medical programs; the former require the University Clinical Aptitude Test (UCAT) whereas the latter require the Graduate Australian Medical School Admissions Test (GAMSAT), or the Medical College Admission Test (MCAT).

Current medical schools

See also
Australian Medical Students' Association
List of medical schools
Medical education in Australia

References 

Medical school
Australia
Medical education in Australia
Medical schools